was a rural district located in Nishimikawa Region in central Aichi Prefecture, Japan.

History
Kamo District (加茂郡) was one of the ancient districts of Shinano Province, but was transferred to Mikawa Province during the Sengoku period. In the cadastral reforms of the early Meiji period, on July 22, 1878 Kamo District was divided into Nishikamo District and Higashikamo District within Aichi Prefecture. With the organization of municipalities on October 1, 1889, Nishikamo District was divided into 30 villages.

Koromo Village was elevated to town status on January 29, 1892. In a round of consolidation, the remaining number of villages was reduced from 29 to seven in 1906. On March 1, 1951 Koromo gained city status and on April 1, 1953 the village of Sanage gained town status, merging with two neighboring villages on March 1, 1955. The village of Takahashi was annexed by Komoro in 1956. On April 1, 1958 the village of Miyoshi gained town status; however, on April 1, 1967 the town of Sange merged with the city of Toyota. The village of Fujioka gained town status on April 1, 1978, leaving the district with two towns and one village.

As of 2004 (the last data available), the district had an estimated population of 16,703 and a population density of 43.84 persons per km2. Its total area was 381.06 km2.

During discussions pertaining to the Municipal mergers and dissolutions in Japan, Miyoshi rejected plans to merge with the city of Toyota on August 5, 2003.

However, on April 1, 2005, the town of Fujioka, and village of Obara, along with the towns of Asahi, Asuke and Inabu, and the village of Shimoyama (all from Higashikamo District), were merged into Toyota.

With the elevation of Miyoshi to city status on January 4, 2010, Nishikamo District was dissolved as a result of this merger.

External links
Counties of Japan

See also
Kamo District, Gifu
Kamo District, Hiroshima
Kamo District, Shizuoka

Former districts of Aichi Prefecture